Oldmeadow is a surname. Notable people with the surname include:

Harry Oldmeadow (born 1947), Australian academic and writer
Max Oldmeadow (1924–2013), Australian politician